Nordic Game is a video game developer conference and trade show held annually in Malmö, Sweden. The Nordic Game conference is held each spring, but since 2020, an autumn event is also created each year - in November 2022 in Helsinki, Finland. The main conference in May offers a three-day program with global and Nordic speakers industry, an Expo for showcasing games and related products, as well as networking and business events bringing games industry professionals together - onsite as well as online on the Nordic Game Discord server. Another highlight is the highly anticipated Nordic Game Awards, first created in 2006. 

In 2013, 1,500 developers, businesspeople, and enthusiasts were expected to participate. The keynote speech that year was given by video game designer Tim Schafer.

In 2016, the Japanese video game designer, screenwriter, director, and producer Hideo Kojima did a Q&A at the conference, and attendance reached 2,500.

The Nordic Game 2017 edition was also held in Malmö, Sweden, while the 2020 edition, on 27–29 May, was held fully online because of the COVID-19 pandemic from a studio built for the occasion at the Nordic Game offices in Malmö. It gathered 1,350 participants, making it arguably the largest such event in the world at that point in 2020. A second 2020 edition, originally planned to be a regular, full physical event, is to be held on 25–27 November, but eventually only with limited physical attendance.

References

External links
 Official website
 Nordic Game Program
 Slagthuset

Video game development
Video game trade shows
Trade fairs in Sweden
Spring (season) events in Sweden